Əsgərabad (also, Əskərabad, Äskärabad, and Askerabad) is a village and municipality in the Bilasuvar Rayon of Azerbaijan.  It has a population of 3,624.

References 

Populated places in Bilasuvar District